Victoria Moroles (born September 4, 1996) is an American actress. She played Andie on the Disney Channel show Liv and Maddie. She has also played Hayden Romero on MTV's Teen Wolf in seasons 5 and 6 (2015–2017). She also starred in the Hulu comedy Plan B, directed by Natalie Morales.

Early life
Moroles was born in Corpus Christi, Texas, and raised in Rockport, Texas, off the Gulf of Mexico. At a young age she was always recruiting friends and family to act out her shows in her living room. She studied dance and participated in theater growing up.

Career
Moroles left Texas during her middle school years to follow her dreams in Los Angeles.

Filmography

Film

Television

References

External links
 

1996 births
Living people
American child actresses
American television actresses
Actresses from Texas
21st-century American actresses
People from Corpus Christi, Texas